Lactarius semisanguifluus is a species of fungus in the family Russulaceae.

See also
List of Lactarius species

References

semisanguifluus
Fungi described in 1950
Fungi of Europe
Edible fungi